Dominique Vian (born 25 December 1944 in Valence, Drôme) is a French overseas departments administrator.

He is a graduate of Institut d’études politiques d'Aix-en-Provence ("Sciences Po Aix").

Career 
He was prefect of French Guiana from February 1997 to August 1999, prefect of Guadeloupe from August 2002 to July 2004, and prefect of Réunion from August 2004 to June 2005.

In 1999 : civil servant of United Nations in Kosovo.

He was commissaire adjoint de la République (name of sub-prefects in this time) of arrondissement of Cognac from 1984 to 1986, in Cognac City (Charente department).

He was prefect of Ardèche in Privas from 1999 to 2002.

He was prefect of Alpes-Maritimes in Nice from August 2006 to October 2008.

Directeur de cabinet (principal private secretary) of François Baroin (Minister of Overseas) from 2005 to 2006.

Special counsellor of Gérard Larcher (President of the Senate of France) from 2008 to 2011.

Chargé de mission (project manager) of Marie-Luce Penchard (Minister in charge of Overseas) from 2011 to 2012.

Honours and awards
 :
 Officer of Légion d’honneur
 Officer of Ordre national du Mérite
 Officer of Ordre du Mérite Maritime
 Médaille d’honneur pour acte de courage et de dévouement (bronze medal)
 : Commander of the Order of the Southern Cross

Sources
  " Vian, Dominique, Marie, André, Ferdinand" (prefect, born 1944), pages 2190-2191 in Who's Who in France : Dictionnaire biographique de personnalités françaises vivant en France et à l’étranger, et de personnalités étrangères résidant en France, 44th edition for 2013 edited in 2012, 2371 p., 31 cm,  .

References

1944 births
People from Valence, Drôme
Living people
Sciences Po Aix alumni
Prefects of French Guiana
Politicians of Réunion
Prefects of Réunion
Prefects of Guadeloupe
Prefects of Ardèche
Prefects of Alpes-Maritimes
Prefects of France
Officiers of the Légion d'honneur
Officers of the Ordre national du Mérite
Officers of the Ordre du Mérite Maritime
Recipients of the Honour medal for courage and devotion